The Battle of the Ogaden was fought in 1936 in the southern front of the Second Italo-Abyssinian War.  The battle consisted of attacks by the Italian forces of General Rodolfo Graziani, the commander-in-chief of the forces on the "southern front", against Ethiopian defensive positions commanded by Ras Nasibu Emmanual.  The strong defensive positions were designed by Wehib Pasha and known as the "Hindenburg Wall".  The battle was primarily fought to the south of Harar and Jijiga.

Background
On 3 October 1935, General Rodolfo Graziani advanced into Ethiopia from Italian Somaliland.  His initial gains were modest.  By November, after additional modest gains and a brief period of Italian inactivity, the initiative on the southern front went over to the Ethiopians.  

Late in the year, Ras Desta Damtew started preparations to launch an offensive with his army of approximately 40,000 men.  His goal was to advance from Negele Boran, take Dolo near the border, and to then invade Italian Somaliland. This plan was not only ill-conceived and overly ambitious, it was the subject of talk at every market place.  What followed was a lop-sided slaughter known as the Battle of Genale Doria.  Between 12 January and 20 January 1936, Ras Desta's army was completely decimated by the Italian Royal Air Force (Regia Aeronautica).

On 31 March, the last Ethiopian army on the northern front was destroyed during the Battle of Maychew.  In just one day, Marshal of Italy Pietro Badoglio routed an army personally commanded by Emperor Haile Selassie I. Believing that Badoglio would not share the laurels of victory with him, Graziani decided to launch an offensive in the south against Ras Nasibu's army.

In April 1936, Ras Nasibu had an army of 28,000 men facing Graziani. In addition, he had the garrisons of Jijiga and Harar.  Much of Ras Nasibu's army was dug in behind defensive positions that ran through Degehabur.  The line was a series of entrenched positions known as the "Hindenburg Wall" in deference to the famous German defensive line of World War I, the "Hindenburg Line". The architect of the Ethiopian version was Wehib Pasha, who had been a general in the army of the Ottoman Empire, and was serving as Ras Nasibu's Chief-of-Staff for the southern front. According to a Time magazine of the period, the "Turkish General (retired)" fancied himself as "the Hero of Gallipoli" after his exploits in that campaign. 

Historians disagree concerning Wehib Pasha's abilities.  According to A. J. Barker, he had "made brilliant use of the ground and exploited to the fullest the military engineering techniques of the day". Anthony Mockler does not express the same opinion of Wehib Pasha's defenses.  He describes them as "half-prepared trenches and gun-sites", manned by two battalions of the Imperial Bodyguard who had fled before the Italians six months before.  Still, David Nicole writes:  "The only real fortified positions [in Ethiopia] were those built by Ras Nasibu's forces under General Mehmet Wehib's (also known as Wehib Pasha) direction near Sassabaneh, southeast of Harar". 

Graziani deployed an army of 38,000 men, which included 15,600 Italians.  The ground forces fielded by Graziani were almost entirely "mechanized" and made use of an air component that was empowered to inflict the maximum losses on the enemy.  As was often his practice, Graziani arranged his attacking forces in three columns.

Battle
On 29 March 1936, in response to numerous insulting messages from Italian dictator Benito Mussolini and from Badoglio chiding him about when he would get started, Graziani sent thirty-three aircraft to Harar to drop twelve tons of bombs.  The town had been declared an "open city" since 2 December 1935 and was devoid of military activity.  The bombings were stopped only when "catastrophic" reports from Europe emerged.

On 14 April, Graziani ordered his entire army to advance towards the Ethiopian defensive lines in a three-pronged attack.  He had decided to fight a "colonial war" with primarily colonial troops.  The 29th Infantry Division "Peloritana" and the 6th CC.NN. Division "Tevere" were held in reserve.

The first column, commanded by General Guglielmo Nasi and including the Libyan Division, on the Italian right was to break through the defenses at Janogoto and Dagahamodo threaten the Ethiopian left.  The second column, commanded by General Luigi Frusci, was to move forward to the pivotal point of the "Hindenburg Wall".  The third column, commanded by General Agostini, was on the Italian left and was to immediately engage the Ethiopian right flank.  The first day passed uneventfully.  The biggest obstacle to the Italian advance was heavy rain, swollen rivers, and thick mud.

The Libyans of the first column encountered stiff resistance that next day, and made only limited progress in the next two days. To move the advance along, tanks, flamethrowers, and artillery were brought up to within a few yards of the entrances of the caves where the harassing Ethiopians were sheltered.  

By 23 April, all three columns were in place in front of the "Hindenburg Wall".  At the first light of dawn on the following day, fighting broke out all along the line.  But it was the Ethiopians on the southern front, hoping to relieve the pressure on their fortified line of defense, who attacked the Italians along the whole front.  However, against the weight of the Italian firepower, the Ethiopians could make little progress.  Even so, the fighting was fierce and surged back and forth.  

It was not until 25 April that the Italians were able to overcome the Ethiopian resistance.  When additional pressure was applied, the "Hindenburg Wall" gave way and the remaining Ethiopian defenders began a withdrawal. Degehabur fell on 30 April and Nasibu withdrew to Harar.  On 2 May, the Emperor left Addis Ababa to go into exile.  On 3 May, about one third of the officers on the southern front followed his example.

Italian success came at the cost of heavy casualties.  In roughly ten days of fighting, the Italians suffered over 2,000 casualties.  While the Ethiopians themselves had over 5,000 casualties, the disparity was much less than was typical.  On the northern front, the usual ratio between Ethiopian and Italian casualties was ten to one.

Aftermath
While the army of Ras Nasibu disintegrated, it was not destroyed.  Unlike some of the other Ethiopian armies bombed or sprayed out of existence, Nasibu's army slipped out of the country or melted into the mountains to become the seeds for later resistance.  But it may have been the overcast skies more than a change of heart on Graziani's part that saved the withdrawing Ethiopians from the Italian Royal Air Force.  Ras Nasibu himself went into exile with the Emperor.

Graziani's only resistance on his march to Jijiga and Harar was the never ending rain. His one aim—to reach Harar before Badoglio's March of the Iron Will reached Addis Ababa—was the victim of a sea of mud that slowed all progress to a crawl.

In the end, Graziani finally reached Harar on 8 May.

See also
 Ethiopian Order of Battle Second Italo-Abyssinian War
 Army of the Ethiopian Empire
List of Second Italo-Ethiopian War weapons of Ethiopia
 Italian Order of Battle Second Italo-Abyssinian War
 Royal Italian Army
List of Italian military equipment in the Second Italo-Ethiopian War

Notes 
Footnotes

Citations

References

External links
Ras Nasibu of the Ogaden

1936 in Ethiopia
Conflicts in 1936
Battles of the Second Italo-Ethiopian War
Battles involving Ethiopia
Battles involving Italy
April 1936 events
Ogaden